This is a list of Belizean television stations.

Television stations 
 Channel 5: Great Belize Television
 Channel 7: Tropical Vision Limited
 Channel 15: Krem TV
 Love Belize
 TeleNova
 Maximum TV
 Plus TV
 Wave TV
 BBN TV : BELIZE BROADCASTING NETWORK
 CTV3 : Centaur Television
 TNC10: The National Channel
 Positive Vibes
 CBTV : Color Blind Multimedia Productions
 Hitz
 BHA TV : Belize Hotel Association Television
 PGTV
 REEF TV
 Guadalupe Media
 Belize Adventist Television Network
 R-JET
 SWITCH TV

See also 
 List of newspapers in Belize

References 

Stations
Television stations
Belize